is a former Japanese football player.

Playing career
Okajima was born in Mitaka on June 30, 1971. After graduating from Chuo University, he joined Urawa Reds in 1994. He got opportunity to play from first season. However he could not play at all in the match in 1995 and he moved to Japan Football League club Tokyo Gas in July. He played many matches as defensive midfielder in 3 season. He retired end of 1997 season.

Club statistics

References

External links

J.League 

1971 births
Living people
Chuo University alumni
Association football people from Tokyo
Japanese footballers
J1 League players
Japan Football League (1992–1998) players
Urawa Red Diamonds players
FC Tokyo players
Association football midfielders